Rosemary Lenton (born 21 August 1949) is a Scottish para lawn bowler and wheelchair curler.

Life and career

Lenton was born in Huddersfield, Yorkshire on 21 August 1949. She has previously competed in sailing and cycling. Complications after routine surgery in 2002 led to her using a wheelchair. She took up bowls in 2005.

She competed at the 2022 Commonwealth Games where she won a gold medal in the Women's pairs B6–8 event alongside Pauline Wilson and became Scotland's oldest Commonwealth Games medallist. She has also competed at the World Bowls Championships 3 times, winning a silver medal in New Zealand in 2015.

As well as lawn bowls Lenton has also competed nine times at the World Wheelchair Curling Championships.

References

1949 births
Living people
Sportspeople from Huddersfield
Scottish female bowls players
Bowls players at the 2022 Commonwealth Games
Commonwealth Games medallists in lawn bowls
Commonwealth Games gold medallists for Scotland
Medallists at the 2022 Commonwealth Games
Scottish wheelchair curlers